Latimeria is a rare genus of fish which contains the only living species of coelacanth. It includes two extant species: the West Indian Ocean coelacanth (Latimeria chalumnae) and the Indonesian coelacanth (Latimeria menadoensis). They follow the oldest known living lineage of Sarcopterygii (lobe-finned fish and tetrapods), which means they are more closely related to lungfish and tetrapods (amphibians, reptiles and mammals) than to the common ray-finned fishes and cartilaginous fishes.

They are found along the coastlines of the Indian Ocean and Indonesia. Since there are only two species of coelacanth and both are threatened, it is one of the most endangered genera of animals in the world. The West Indian Ocean coelacanth is a critically endangered species.

Biological characteristics

 
Based on growth rings in the creatures' ear bones (otoliths), scientists infer that individual coelacanths may live as long as 80 to 100 years.

Living examples of Latimeria chalumnae have a deep blue color which probably camouflages them from prey species; however, the Indonesian species (L. menadoensis) is brown.

Coelacanth eyes are very sensitive, and have a tapetum lucidum. Coelacanths are almost never caught in the daytime, but have been caught at all phases of the moon. Coelacanth eyes have many rods, receptors in the retina that help animals see in dim light. Together, the rods and tapetum help the fish see better in dark water.

Coelacanths are opportunistic feeders, hunting cuttlefish, squid, snipe eels, small sharks, and other fish found in their deep reef and volcanic slope habitats. Coelacanths are also known to swim head down, backwards or belly up to locate their prey, presumably using their rostral glands.

Scientists suspect that one reason this fish has been so successful is that specimens are able to slow down their metabolisms at will, sinking into the less-inhabited depths and minimizing their nutritional requirements in a sort of hibernation mode.

The coelacanths which live near Sodwana Bay, South Africa, rest in caves at depths of  during daylight hours, but disperse and swim to depths as shallow as  when hunting at night. They will rise or sink to find these conditions. The amount of oxygen their blood can absorb from the water through the gills is dependent on water temperature.

Scientific research suggests the coelacanth must stay in cold, well-oxygenated water or else its blood cannot absorb enough oxygen. The fish seems to be very well adapted to its environment, which is seen as one of the reasons why it has the slowest evolving genome of all known vertebrates.

Reproduction
Female coelacanths give birth to live young, called "pups", in groups of between five and 25 fry at a time; the pups are capable of surviving on their own immediately after birth. Their reproductive behaviors are not well known, but it is believed that they are not sexually mature until after 20 years of age. It was thought that gestation time was 13 to 15 months, though research carried out in 2021 now suggests a gestation period of up to five years.

Discoveries

First find in South Africa

On December 23, 1938, Hendrik Goosen, the captain of the trawler Nerine, returned to the harbour at East London, South Africa, after a trawl between the Chalumna and Ncera Rivers. As he frequently did, he telephoned his friend, Marjorie Courtenay-Latimer, curator at East London's small museum, to see if she wanted to look over the contents of the catch for anything interesting, and told her of the strange fish he has set aside for her.

Correspondence in the archives of the South African Institute for Aquatic Biodiversity (SAIAB, formerly the JLB Smith Institute of Ichthyology) show that Goosen went to great lengths to avoid any damage to this fish and ordered his crew to set it aside for the East London Museum.  Goosen later told how the fish was steely blue when first seen, but by the time the 'Nerine' entered East London harbour many hours later, the fish had become dark grey.

Failing to find a description of the creature in any of her books, she attempted to contact her friend, Professor James Leonard Brierley Smith, but he was away for Christmas.  Unable to preserve the fish, she reluctantly sent it to a taxidermist.  When Smith returned, he immediately recognized it as a type of coelacanth, a group of fish previously known only from fossils. Smith named the new coelacanth Latimeria chalumnae in honor of Marjorie Courtenay-Latimer and the waters in which it was found.  The two discoverers received immediate recognition, and the fish became known as a "living fossil". The 1938 coelacanth is still on display in the East London, South Africa, museum.

However, as the specimen had been stuffed, the gills and skeleton were not available for examination, and some doubt therefore remained as to whether it was truly the same species. Smith began a hunt for a second specimen that would take more than a decade.

Comoros

Smith distributed thousands of flyers with a photograph of the fish, description, and reward, but World War II interrupted the search. The 100 Pound sterling reward was a very substantial sum to the average subsistence fisherman of the time. Fourteen years later, one specimen was found in the Comoros, but the fish was no stranger to the locals; in the port of Domoni on the Comoran island of Anjouan, the Comorians were puzzled to be so rewarded for a "gombessa" or "mame", their names for the nearly inedible fish that their fishermen occasionally caught by mistake.

The second specimen, found just before Christmas 1952 by Comoran fisherman Ahamadi Abdallah, was described as a different species, first as Malania hunti and later as Malania anjounae, after Daniel François Malan, the South African Prime Minister who had dispatched an SAAF Dakota at the behest of Professor Smith to fetch the specimen. It was later discovered that the lack of a first dorsal fin, at first thought to be significant, was caused by an injury early in the specimen's life. Malan was a staunch creationist; when he was first shown the primitive creature, he exclaimed, with a twinkle, "My, it is ugly. Do you mean to say we once looked like that?" The specimen retrieved by Smith is on display at the SAIAB in Grahamstown, South Africa where he worked.

A third specimen was caught in September 1953 and a fourth in January 1954. The Comorans are now aware of the significance of the endangered species, and have established a program to return accidentally-caught coelacanth to deep water.

As for Smith, who died in 1968, his account of the coelacanth story appeared in the book Old Fourlegs, first published in 1956.  His book Sea Fishes of the Indian Ocean, illustrated and co-authored by his wife Margaret, remains the standard ichthyological reference for the region.

Second species in Indonesia

On September 18, 1997, Arnaz and Mark Erdmann, traveling in Indonesia on their honeymoon, saw a strange fish enter the market at Manado Tua, on the island of Sulawesi. Mark thought it was a gombessa (Comoro coelacanth), although it was brown, not blue. An expert noticed their pictures on the Internet and realized its significance. Subsequently, the Erdmanns contacted local fishermen and asked for any future catches of the fish to be brought to them.

A second Indonesian specimen, 1.2 m in length and weighing 29 kg, was captured alive on July 30, 1998. It lived for six hours, allowing scientists to photographically document its coloration, fin movements and general behavior. The specimen was preserved and donated to the Bogor Zoological Museum, part of the Indonesian Institute of Sciences.

DNA testing revealed this specimen differed genetically from the Comorian population. Superficially, the Indonesian coelacanth, locally called raja laut (king of the sea), appears to be the same as those found in the Comoros, except the background coloration of the skin is brownish-gray rather than bluish. This fish was described in a 1999 issue of Comptes Rendus de l'Académie des sciences Paris by Pouyaud et al. It was given the scientific name Latimeria menadoensis. A recent molecular study estimated the divergence time between the two coelacanth species to be 40–30 mya.

On May 19, 2007, Justinus Lahama, an Indonesian fisherman, caught a 1.3-metre-long, 50 kg/110 pound coelacanth off the coast near Manado, on northern Sulawesi Island near Bunaken National Marine Park. After spending 30 minutes out of water, the fish, still alive, was placed in a netted pool in front of a restaurant at the edge of the sea. It survived for 17 hours. Coelacanths usually live at depths of 200–1,000 metres. The fish was filmed by local authorities swimming in the metre-deep pool, then frozen after it died. AFP claim French, Japanese and Indonesian scientists working with the French Institute for Development and Research carried out a necropsy on the coelacanth with genetic analysis to follow.
The local university is now studying the carcass.

iSimangaliso Wetland Park in South Africa
In South Africa, the search continued on and off over the years.  A 46-year-old diver, Rehan Bouwer, lost his life searching for coelacanths in June 1998.

On 28 October 2000, just south of the Mozambique border in Sodwana Bay in the St. Lucia Marine Protected Area, three deep-water divers, Pieter Venter, Peter Timm, and Etienne le Roux, made a dive to 104 metres and unexpectedly spotted a coelacanth.

Calling themselves "SA Coelacanth Expedition 2000", the group returned with photographic equipment and several additional members.  On 27 November, after an unsuccessful initial dive the previous day, four members of the group, Pieter Venter, Gilbert Gunn, Christo Serfontein, and Dennis Harding, found three coelacanths.  The largest was between 1.5 and 1.8 metres in length; the other two were from 1.0 to 1.2 metres.  The fish swam head-down and appeared to be feeding from the cavern ledges.  The group returned with video footage and photographs of the coelacanths.

During the dive, however, Serfontein lost consciousness, and 34-year-old Dennis Harding rose to the surface with him in an uncontrolled ascent.  Harding complained of neck pains and died from a cerebral embolism while on the boat.  Serfontein recovered after being taken underwater for decompression sickness treatment.

In March–April 2002, the Jago Submersible and Fricke Dive Team descended into the depths off Sodwana and observed 15 coelacanths.  A dart probe was used to collect tissue samples.

Tanzania
Coelacanths have been caught off the coast of Tanzania since 2004. Two coelacanths were initially reported captured off Songo Mnara, a small island off the edge of the Indian Ocean in August 2003. A spate of 19 more specimens of these extremely rare fishes weighing between 25 and 80 kg were reported netted in the space of the next five months, with another specimen captured in January 2005. A coelacanth weighing as much as 110 kg was reported by the Observer newspaper in 2006.

Officials of the Tanga Coastal Zone Conservation and Development Programme, which has a long-term strategy for protecting the species, see a connection with the timing of the captures with trawling - especially by  Japanese vessels - near the coelacanth's habitat, as within a couple of days of trawlers casting their nets, coelacanths have turned up in deep-water gill nets intended for sharks. The sudden appearance of the coelacanths off Tanzania has raised real worries about its future due to damage done to the coelacanth population by the effects of indiscriminate trawling methods and habitat damage.

Hassan Kolombo, a programme co-ordinator, said, "Once we do not have trawlers, we don't get the coelacanths, it's as simple as that." His colleague, Solomon Makoloweka, said they had been pressuring the Tanzanian government to limit trawlers' activities. He said, "I suppose we should be grateful to these trawlers, because they have revealed this amazing and unique fish population. But we are concerned they could destroy these precious things. We want the government to limit their activity and to help fund a proper research program so that we can learn more about the coelacanths and protect them."

In a March 2008 report,  the Tanzania Natural Resource Forum, a local environmental nongovernmental organization, warned that a proposed port project at Mwambani Bay could threaten a coastal population of coelacanth.

Evolutionary relationships 
Latimeria is the type genus of Latimeriidae, a group of coelacanths that first appeared in the Early Triassic. Within Latimeriidae, it has been found by cladistic analysis to be most closely related to the genus Swenzia, known from the Late Jurassic of Europe, leaving a long ghost lineage of over 150 million years from its closest relative.

References

 
Lobe-finned fish genera
Live-bearing fish
Ovoviviparous fish
Marine fish genera
Taxa named by J. L. B. Smith
Extant Pleistocene first appearances